is the pen name of a Japanese manga artist known for his works in the magazine Weekly Shōnen Jump. His most famous work is the gag manga series Tottemo! Luckyman.

Notable works 
 Rinkiōhenman (臨機応変マン) – published in Jump Comics for 4 volumes, 1986-88
 Suupaa Booyaken-chan (スーパーボーヤケンちゃん) – published in Jump Comics for 2 volumes, 1989
 Toraburu Kanchu ki (トラブル昆虫記) – one-shot in Weekly Shonen Jump, 1990
 Tottemo! Luckyman (とっても! ラッキーマン) – serialized Weekly Shonen Jump 1993–1997; published in Jump Comics for 16 volumes
 Countdown hero 21st century man (COUNT DOWN ヒーロー21世紀マン) – serialized in Weekly Shonen Jump, 2 issues, 1998
 Boku wa Shōnen Tantei Dan (ぼくは少年探偵ダン!!)  serialized in Weekly Shonen Jump, 1998–99; published in Jump Comics for 2 volumes, 1999
 Bonjūru jin de bōn! !  (ボンジュール ジンでボーン!!) – serialized in Weekly Shonen Jump, 2 issues, 2000
 Bakabakashiino! (バカバカしいの!) – serialized in Weekly Shonen Jump, 2000-01
 Detaa~h Wantsuu Pantsu-kun (でたぁーっ わんつーぱんつくん)
 Gamouhirosh Yose Atsumei (ガモウひろし寄せ集め) – published in Shueisha Bunko for 2 volumes, 2009

References 

Manga artists
Living people
1962 births
20th-century pseudonymous writers